The Freedom of the City of Dublin is awarded by Dublin City Council after approving a person nominated by the Lord Mayor. Eighty-two people have been honoured under the current process introduced in 1876. Most honourees have made a contribution to the life of the city or of Ireland in general, including politicians, public servants, humanitarians, artists and entertainers; others were distinguished members of the Irish diaspora and foreign leaders, honoured visiting Dublin. Honourees sign the roll of freedmen in a ceremony at City Hall or the Mansion House and are presented with an illuminated scroll by the Lord Mayor.

Ancient privileges and duties 
In ancient boroughs such as Dublin, a royal charter established the privileges of the "burgesses" (or "citizens" in places like Dublin with city status). Admission as a freeman or citizen was principally granted to members of the Guilds of the City of Dublin and others by "special grace", as well as by marriage or descent from existing citizens. The wealthy could buy freedom by paying a "fine", and some of the penal laws facilitated Protestant immigrants' becoming freemen.

Ancient charters were superseded for municipal governance purposes by the Municipal Corporations (Ireland) Act 1840 and for all other non-ceremonial purposes by the Local Government Act 2001. Nevertheless, ancient privileges and duties of freemen are sometimes cited in relation to the modern award. Rights included:
 Exemption from octroi charged on goods brought through the city gates.
 Pasturage of sheep on city commons, which included College Green and St Stephen's Green. This right was exercised as a publicity stunt by U2 members the day after their 2000 conferring.
 The right to vote in municipal elections, and in the Irish parliamentary borough of Dublin (after the Acts of Union 1800 in the UK parliamentary borough of Dublin). 
Freedmen had a duty to defend the city and could be called into the militia at short notice. In 1454, apprentices to be admitted freemen needed a bow and sword, while merchants additionally needed a coat of mail and helmet.

Honorary Freedom 
While the Representation of the People Act 1918 abolished the franchise rights of freemen, the Municipal Privileges Ireland Act 1876 allowed the establishment of the title of "Honorary Freemen". This was retained by Local Government Act 1991 and currently the Local Government Act 2001.

Notes

Sources

References

External links
 Freedom of the City 88 photographs from the Dublin City Council public libraries website

Culture in Dublin (city)
Dublin
Dublin (city)-related lists
Irish awards